The 1934 Milan–San Remo was the 27th edition of the Milan–San Remo cycle race and was held on 26 March 1934. The race started in Milan and finished in San Remo. The race was won by Jef Demuysere.

General classification

References

1934
1934 in road cycling
1934 in Italian sport
March 1934 sports events